The Greenhorn Valley lies in southern Pueblo County, Colorado just east of Greenhorn Mountain. It includes the communities of Colorado City and Rye.

Colorado State Highway 165, part of the Frontier Pathways Scenic Byway, goes through the valley and serves as its main street. Interstate 25 marks the eastern end of the valley.

Geography

The western part of the valley borders on the San Isabel National Forest. Lake Beckwith, both a reservoir managed by the Colorado City Metropolitan District and a state wildlife area managed by Colorado Parks and Wildlife, offers fishing, walking, and canoeing. Greenhorn Creek rises on Greenhorn Mountain and traverses the valley which is situated where the creek leaves the mountains and emerges onto the Great Plains.

History
The mountain, creek, and valley are named after Cuerno Verde (Greenhorn in English), a Comanche chief and war leader who raided the Spanish settlements in New Mexico. He was defeated and killed, possibly in Greenhorn valley, in 1779 by a New Mexican army led by Governor Juan Bautista de Anza.

The Taos Mountain Trail crossed Greenhorn Creek near present day Colorado City. The first settlement in the valley was in 1845, when mountain man John Brown, his wife Luisa Sandoval, and several children established a trading post where the trail crossed the creek. Brown and his family left Greenwood for California in 1849. In 1853, Lt. Edward Griffin Beckwith, an army officer, said of the valley, "six New Mexican families had built an irrigation system to divert the water from Greenhorn Creek to water their crops of corn, wheat, beans and watermelon. Their homes were built of adobe which stood shoulder to shoulder and were surrounded by a close fence of high pickets. They also had corrals for the safe keeping of their stock."

Estefana (also Estefania) Bent, one of the two daughters of former New Mexico governor Charles Bent, inherited land in the Greenwood Valley and in 1859 moved there with her husband Alexander Hicklin, building a ranch house near where Brown's trading post had been. Hicklin became the first postmaster of the Greenwood Post Office in 1866 and established a stagecoach station in 1867.  He died in 1874. Estefana Bent's ownership of the land was disputed in many long-running court battles. Her son, Alexander, was killed by a squatter on the ranch in 1878. She died penniless in 1927.

Education
Greenhorn Valley Schools serves the valley with three schools: Rye Elementary School, Craver Middle School, and Rye High School.

References

External links
 The Greenhorn Valley View, a weekly newspaper serving the valley
 Greenhorn Valley Chamber of Commerce
 Greenhorn Valley Schools

Geography of Pueblo County, Colorado
Valleys of Colorado